Bob Larkin (born July 10, 1949) is an American comics artist primarily known for his painted covers for Marvel Comics' magazine-format titles Marvel Magazines in the 1970s and early 1980s and for his 32 painted covers on the Bantam Books  paperback reissues series of the  Doc Savage pulp novels.

Biography
Bob Larkin began his career as an illustrator in 1969 and his many credits include titles such as Crazy Magazine, Deadly Hands of Kung-Fu, Marvel Preview, Marvel Super Special, Planet of the Apes, Savage Sword of Conan, and The Tomb of Dracula. Larkin painted covers for many of the Marvel Fireside Books paperback collections, lending them a simple, movie-poster feel. He did the same thing for the cover to the second major intercompany crossover, Superman and Spider-Man. In addition, Marvel occasionally tapped Larkin to paint covers for premiere issues of such comic book titles as Dazzler (March 1981) and The Saga of Crystar (May 1983). A rare example of Larkin providing interior art is the three-page story "For the Next 60 Seconds" in Epic Illustrated #1 (Spring 1980).

Besides his work for Marvel, Larkin has painted covers for Vampirella and The Rook (Warren Publishing), The Amazing Adventures of Holo-Man (Peter Pan Records), Lorelei: Building the Perfect Beast (StarWarp Concepts), and many others.

Larkin provided covers to Bantam Books reprints of Doc Savage, as well as World Wrestling Entertainment merchandise featuring The Rock, Stone Cold Steve Austin, The Undertaker, Kane, and Chris Jericho.

Personal life
With former wife Fran, Larkin is the father of son Ken and daughters Claire and Holly.

Bibliography

Covers

DC Comics
 The Resistance #8 (2003)

Hammond Incorporated
 Hammond's Captain Atlas and the Globe Riders #1 (1987)

Marvel Comics
 Bizarre Adventures #28 (1981)
 Conan Saga #26, 38, 43, 45, 67, 77, 90 (1989–1994)
 Conan: The Ravagers Out of Time GN (1992)
 Crazy Magazine #17–63, 65, 68–69, 71–72, 74–75, 77–78, 80–81, 83–94 (1976–1983)
 Dazzler #1 (1981)
 Deadly Hands of Kung Fu #5–6, 8, 19, 21–22, 24, 31 (1974–1976)
 Haunt of Horror #1, 4 (1974)
 The Hulk! #11, 14, 18, 21–22 (1978–1980)
 Marvel Graphic Novel: The Amazing Spider-Man: Parallel Lives (1989)
 Marvel Illustrated Books
 The Marvel Comics Illustrated Version of Captain America #02883 (1982) 
 The Marvel Comics Illustrated Version of Fantastic Four #02838 (1982) 
 The Marvel Comics Illustrated Version of Star Trek #02821 (1982) 
 The Marvel Comics Illustrated Version of the Incredible Hulk #02832 (1982) 
 Mighty Marvel Team-Up Thrillers (1983) 
 Spider-Man: His Greatest Team-Up Battles #02722 (1981) 
 Stan Lee Presents Spider-Man 2 Together with Thor, Havok and the Man-Thing! #02858 (1982)  
 Stan Lee Presents The Marvel Comics Illustrated Version of Daredevil #02041 (1982)  
 Marvel Preview #7, 18–19, 21 (1976–1980)
 Marvel Special Edition Featuring Star Wars: The Empire Strikes Back #2 (1980)
 Marvel Super Action #1 (1976)
 Marvel Super Special #3, 5–6, 15–16 (1978–1980)
 Marvel Treasury Edition #28 (Superman and Spider-Man) (1981)
 Monsters of the Movies #2–8 (1974–1975)
 Monsters Unleashed #5 (1974)
 Nick Fury vs. S.H.I.E.L.D. tpb (1989)
 Planet of the Apes #1–7, 10, 13, 15, 17, 19, 24 (1974–1976)
 Power Man and Iron Fist #75 (1981)
 The Punisher Magazine #13 (1990)
 The Punisher: A Man Named Frank (1994)
 The Punisher War Zone #25 (1994)
 The Saga of Crystar, Crystal Warrior #1 (1983)
 Savage Sword of Conan #27, 42–44, 82, 89, 92–93, 103, 120, 137, 141, 192, 198, 206 (1978–1993)
 Spider-Man Team-Up #6 (1997)
 Spider-Woman #50 (1983)
 The Tomb of Dracula vol. 2 #1–3 (1979–1980)
 Vampire Tales Annual #1 (1975)

Peter Pan Records
 Amazing Adventures of Holo-Man (Book and Record Set) #PR36 (1978)

Simon & Schuster
 Marvel Fireside Books
 The Amazing Spider-Man (1979) 
 Doctor Strange Master of the Mystic Arts (1979) 
 The Fantastic Four (1979) 
 The Incredible Hulk (1978) 
 The Mighty Marvel Pin-Up Book (1978) 
 Marvel Novel Series
 #1 The Amazing Spider-Man: Mayhem in Manhattan (1978) 
 #6 Iron Man: And Call My Killer...MODOK! (1979) 
 #7 Doctor Strange: Nightmare (1979) 
 #8 The Amazing Spider-Man: Crime Campaign (1979) 
 #11 The Hulk and Spider-Man: Murdermoon (1979)

Warren Publishing
 Creepy #99–100 (1978)
 Eerie #119 (1981)
 The Rook Magazine #2–3, 6, 8–9, 11–12 (1980–1981)
 Vampirella #73 (1978)
 Warren Presents #8, 14 (1980–1981)

References

External links
 
 Bob Larkin at the Unofficial Handbook of Marvel Comics Creators
 Bob Larkin The Illustrated Man

1949 births
20th-century American painters
21st-century American painters
21st-century male artists
American comics artists
American illustrators
American male painters
American speculative fiction artists
Fantasy artists
Living people
Marvel Comics people
Science fiction artists